Diet Coke (also branded as Coca-Cola Light, Coca-Cola Diet or Coca-Cola Light Taste) is a sugar-free and low-calorie soft drink produced and distributed by the Coca-Cola Company. It contains artificial sweeteners instead of sugar. Unveiled on July 8, 1982, and introduced in the United States on August 9, 1982, it was the first new brand since 1886 to use the Coca-Cola trademark. The product quickly overtook the company's existing diet cola, Tab (which was discontinued in 2022), in sales.

History 

When diet colas first entered the market, beginning with Diet Rite, the Coca-Cola Company had a long-standing policy to use the Coca-Cola name only on its flagship cola, and so its diet cola was named Tab when it was released in 1963. Its rival Pepsi had no such qualms, and after the long-term success of its sugar-free Diet Pepsi (launched in 1964) became clear, Coca-Cola decided to launch a competing sugar-free brand under the Coca-Cola name that could be marketed more easily than Tab. Diet Coke was launched in 1982 and quickly overtook Tab in sales by a wide margin, though the older drink would remain on the market for decades until the COVID-19 pandemic forced Coca-Cola to discontinue Tab along with other slower-selling drinks in 2020.

Diet Coke is not based on the Coca-Cola formula, but instead on Tab. The controversial New Coke, introduced in 1985, used a version of the Diet Coke recipe that contained high-fructose corn syrup and had a slightly different balance of ingredients. In 2005, the company introduced Coca-Cola Zero (renamed Coca-Cola Zero Sugar in 2017), a sugar-free formula more closely based on original Coca-Cola.

In 2005, under pressure from retailer Walmart (which was impressed with the over-the-counter popularity of Splenda sweetener), the company released a new formulation called "Diet Coke sweetened with Splenda". Sucralose and acesulfame potassium replaced aspartame in this version. As the formulation was done to mollify one retailer, this variety had little advertising and promotion, as the company preferred to market Coca-Cola Zero instead. By late 2009, most distributors had stopped distributing the Splenda-formulated Diet Coke.

In 2018, in an effort to be more appealing to millennials, Diet Coke was packaged in a taller, more slender can (of the same volume) and introduced four new flavors. The cans reverted to the conventional shape a year later.

Sales 
Diet Coke and Diet Pepsi have capitalized on the markets of people who require low sugar regimens, such as diabetics and people concerned with calorie intake. In the UK, a 330 ml can of Diet Coke contains around 1.3 kilocalories (5 kilojoules) compared to 142 kilocalories (595 kJ) for a regular can of Coca-Cola.

Sweeteners
Diet Coke in the US was sweetened with aspartame, an artificial sweetener, after the sweetener became available in the United States in 1983. Early on, to save money, this was also originally in a blend with saccharin. After Diet Rite cola advertised its 100 percent use of aspartame, and the manufacturer of NutraSweet (then G. D. Searle & Company) warned that the NutraSweet trademark would not be made available to a blend of sweeteners, Coca-Cola switched the formula to 100 percent aspartame. Diet Coke from fountain dispensers still contains some saccharin to extend shelf life.

According to the Coca-Cola Company, the sweetener blend is "formulated for each country based on consumer preference". In countries in which cyclamates are not banned (as they were in the US in 1970), Diet Coke or Coca-Cola Light may be sweetened with a blend containing aspartame, cyclamates, and acesulfame potassium.

Brand portfolio

Product timeline 

 1982 – Diet Coke is introduced, becoming the largest-selling low-calorie soft drink in America.
 1983 – Diet Coke is introduced in the UK.
 1986 – Diet Cherry Coke is introduced in American markets.
 1994 – Diet Coke changes logo.
 1999 – Diet Cherry Coke changes logo.
 2001 – Diet Coke with Lemon is introduced.
 2002 – Diet Vanilla Coke is introduced.
 Diet Coke and Diet Cherry Coke change logo.
 2004 – Diet Coke with Lime is introduced.
 Diet Coke with Lemon changes logo.
 2005 – Diet Coke sweetened with Splenda is introduced.
 Diet Cherry Coke and Diet Vanilla Coke change logos and are renamed.
 2006 – Diet Coke Black Cherry Vanilla is introduced.
 Diet Coke with Lemon and Diet Coke Vanilla are discontinued.
 2007 – Diet Coke Plus is introduced.
 Diet Coke Black Cherry Vanilla is discontinued.
 Diet Coke and its six flavors changes logo.
 2011 – Diet Coke surpasses Pepsi in sales for the first time to become the second most popular soda in the United States after Coca-Cola.
 2013 – In the UK, Coca-Cola swapped the logo on Coca-Cola, Diet Coke and Coke Zero bottles and cans in the UK with 150 of Britain's most popular names for a summer-long "Share a Coke" campaign.
 2014 – In the US Coca-Cola swapped the logo on Coca-Cola, Diet Coke and Coke Zero bottles and cans in the US with 150 of America's most popular names for a summer-long "Share a Coke" campaign
 2014 – Diet Coke invites consumers to 'Get A Taste' of the good life. This campaign asks the question "what if life tasted this good?". Television commercials debuted September 24. The first commercial take place on an airplane when a woman is surrounded by crying babies but takes a sip of Diet Coke and opens her eyes into a speak-easy party.
 2018 – On January 22, Diet Coke introduced Ginger Lime, Feisty Cherry, Zesty Blood Orange and Twisted Mango flavors in a skinny can, targeting millennials.
 2019 – Diet Coke added two new flavors, Blueberry Acai and Strawberry Guava to their "Because I Can" Campaign line.

Advertising slogans 

 "Just for the taste of it!" (US 1982, 1986, 1991, 1995, 2000, 2009, 2014)
 "The one of a kind" (US 1984)
 "Taste it all!" (US 1993)
 "This Is Refreshment" (US 1994)
 "You are what you drink" (US 1998)
 "Live Your Life" (US 2001)
 "Do what feels good" (US 2002)
 "Must be a Diet Coke thing" (US 2004)
 "Life is how you take it" (US 2005)
 "Light it up!" (US 2006)
 "Yours" (US 2007)
 "Enjoyment" (US 2007)
 "What life should be like." (US 2008)
 "Open Happiness" (Worldwide 2009–Present)
 "Hello You..." (UK 2009)
 "I light it" (Spain 2010)
 "Stay Extraordinary" (US 2010–2014)
 "You're On" (US 2014)
 "Get a Taste." (US 2014–2018)
 "Because I can." (US 2018–present)

 "Give yourself a Diet Coke break." (UK 2020)
 "Just because." (Worldwide 2021)

Health assessment 

 
The most commonly distributed version of Diet Coke uses aspartame as a sweetener. As one of the most intensively scrutinized food additives, the safety of aspartame has been studied since its discovery. Aspartame has been deemed safe for human consumption by the regulatory agencies of many countries.

See also 
 Diet Coke and Mentos eruption
 Diet Coke Break

References

External links 

 

Diet drinks
Coca-Cola cola brands
Products introduced in 1982
Food and drink introduced in the 1980s
Caffeinated soft drinks